Dar El Cherif is an old palace in the Medina of Tunis.  It is located in Sidi Maaouia Street, near El Monastiri and Achour Streets.

The palace was built in the middle of the 19th century.  It is known for its italian facade.

Gallery

References

See also 

Palaces